Zarnewanz is a municipality  in the Rostock district, in Mecklenburg-Vorpommern, Germany.

References

External links 

 Municipality of Zarnewanz